The Cosmos Mercury was a fourteen-cylinder twin-row air-cooled radial aeroengine. Designed by Roy Fedden of Cosmos Engineering, it was built in the United Kingdom in 1917. It produced 347 horsepower (259 kW). It did not enter production; a large order was cancelled due to the Armistice.

Design and development
Built at Bristol by Brazil-Straker under the direction of Roy Fedden, the Mercury featured an unusual crankshaft and connecting rod arrangement that dispensed with the more normal design of a single master rod linking to individual rods for each cylinder. It was said to run well without vibration and set an unofficial time to climb record while fitted to a Bristol 21A Scout F.1, the aircraft achieving 10,000 ft (3,000 m) in 5.4 minutes and 20,000 ft (6,000 m) in 16.25 minutes.

An Admiralty order for 200 engines was placed in 1917 but was later cancelled by Lord Weir due to the end of World War I, it is also stated that Lord Weir had a preference for the ABC Dragonfly.

The name was re-used by Fedden for the later nine-cylinder Bristol Mercury radial engine.

Applications
 Bristol Scout F

Specifications (Mercury)

See also

References

Notes

Bibliography

 Gunston, Bill. World Encyclopedia of Aero Engines. Cambridge, England. Patrick Stephens Limited, 1989. 
 Lumsden, Alec. British Piston Engines and their Aircraft. Marlborough, Wiltshire: Airlife Publishing, 2003. .

External links
 Contemporary article on Cosmos Engineering's air-cooled radial engines. Photos of the Mercury are on page 869, and a short technical description is on page 871.
Flight magazine, 22 May 1919 - Flightglobal.com, archived on 11 October 2012
Flight magazine, 12 February 1960 - Flightglobal.com, archived on 11 October 2012 
Cosmos Mercury at Aviationarchive.org

1910s aircraft piston engines
Aircraft air-cooled radial piston engines